Hotel Paper is the second studio album by American singer-songwriter Michelle Branch. It was released on June 24, 2003 through Maverick. The production on the album was handled by a variety of record producers such as Josh Abraham, Rick DePofi, John Leventhal, John Shanks & Greg Wells.

Hotel Paper was supported by three singles: "Are You Happy Now?", "Breathe" and "'Til I Get over You". The album received mixed critical reviews and debuted at number two on the US Billboard 200, selling 157,000 copies in its first week. The album was certified platinum by the Recording Industry Association of America (RIAA) in December 2003.

Background
Some of the major themes on Hotel Paper are leaving things behind, constantly being on the move, independence, the mysteries of bus stations and spirituality. The album's cover is a photograph of Branch by Sheryl Nields.

Singles
"Are You Happy Now?", the album's first single, peaked at number 16 on the US Billboard Hot 100. It was nominated for a Grammy Award for Best Female Rock Vocal Performance, Branch's third nomination. The second single was "Breathe", which reached number 36 on the Hot 100 and became a top five club hit. A third single, "'Til I Get over You", was released with no music video and failed to chart.

Commercial performance
Hotel Paper debuted at number two on US Billboard 200 chart, selling 157,000 copies in its first week. This became Branch's first US top-ten debut and highest first-week sales to date. In its second week, the album dropped to number four on the chart, selling an additional 85,000 copies. In its third week, the album dropped to number six on the chart, selling 65,000 more copies. The album spent a total of 33 weeks on the US Billboard 200 chart. On December 9, 2003, the album was certified platinum by the Recording Industry Association of America (RIAA) for shipments of over a million copies. As of March 2009, the album had sold 1,116,000 copies in the United States.

In Canada, the album peaked at number four on the Canadian Album Chart and was certified gold for shipments of over 50,000 copies.

Track listing

Personnel

Musicians
Michelle Branch – acoustic guitar, guitar, percussion, vocals
Josh Abraham – keyboards
Kenny Aronoff – drums
Paul Bushnell – bass
Chris Chaney – bass
Luis Conte – percussion
Sheryl Crow – vocals on "Love Me like That"
Rick DePofi – percussion
Mike Elizondo – bass
John Leventhal – bass, guitar, keyboards
Brian MacLeod – drums
Jamie Muhoberac – keyboards
Dave Navarro – guitar
Shawn Pelton – drums
Dan Rothchild – bass
John Shanks – bass, guitar
Stuart Smith – mandolin
Patrick Warren – keyboards
Greg Wells – Hammond B3, bass, guitar, piano, Wurlitzer
Jessica Harp – backing vocals on "Desperately"

Production
Producers: Josh Abraham, Rick DePofi, John Leventhal, John Shanks, Greg Wells
Engineers: Daniel Chase, Greg Collins, Rick DePofi, Marc DeSisto, Lars Fox, Chris Reynolds, Jeff Rothschild, Brian Scheuble, Ryan Williams
Assistant engineers: Chris Holmes, Brian Humphrey, Eric Reichers, Mark Valentine
Mixing: Josh Abraham, assistant: Jesse Gorman, Chris Lord-Alge, Roger Moutenot, Jim Scott
Mastering: Brian Gardner
Assistant: Jorge Velez
Production coordination: Jill Dell'Abate
Programming: Josh Abraham
String arrangements: David Campbell
Photography: Sheryl Nields

Charts

Weekly charts

Year-end charts

Certifications

References

2003 albums
Albums produced by Josh Abraham
Maverick Records albums
Michelle Branch albums
Albums produced by John Shanks
Albums produced by John Leventhal
Albums produced by Greg Wells